Source 2 is a video game engine developed by Valve. The engine was announced in 2015  as the successor to the original Source engine, with the first game to use it, Dota 2, being ported from Source that same year. Since then, Valve's Artifact, Dota Underlords, and Half-Life: Alyx have all been made with the engine.

History
Plans for a successor to the original Source engine began following the release of Half-Life 2: Episode Two in 2007. The first engine tech demo was created in 2010 by remaking a map from Left 4 Dead 2. Images of this were leaked onto the internet in early 2014. At the 2014 Game Developers Conference, Valve employee Sergiy Migdalskiy showed off a Source 2 physics debugging tool being used in Left 4 Dead 2. Source 2 was first made available via Steam Workshop tools for Dota 2 in 2014 prior to it being officially announced at the 2015 Game Developers Conference. There, Valve stated their intent for it was to allow for content to be created more efficiently. Valve also stated that it would support the Vulkan graphics API and use a new in-house physics engine called Rubikon, which would replace the need for the third-party Havok tools. 

Gabe Newell, president and founder of Valve, said that the company were prioritizing the development of their own games before they would release the engine and its software development kit to the public as a means of ensuring the highest quality for developers; adding that they were intending to make the engine free to use for game developers as long as the game is published on their Steam service.

In June 2015, Valve announced that the entirety of Dota 2 would be ported over to Source 2 in an update called Dota 2 Reborn. Reborn was first released to the public as an opt-in beta update that same month before officially replacing the original client in September 2015, making it the first game to use the engine. Source 2 has also been used for Valve's Artifact and Dota Underlords, with the engine later being supported on Android and iOS for the latter. The engine also supports the creation of games in virtual reality, being used in SteamVR Home, the Robot Repair tech demo within The Lab, and Half-Life: Alyx. Source 2 tools made specifically for creating content for Half-Life: Alyx were released in May 2020.

Games

References

C++ software
Game engines that support Vulkan (API)
Proprietary software
Source (game engine)
Video game engines
3D graphics software
Valve Corporation
Game engines for Linux
IPhone video game engines
Software development kits